Bradfield's swift (Apus bradfieldi) is a species of swift in the family Apodidae.

It is found in Angola, Botswana, Namibia, and South Africa.

The common name and Latin binomial commemorate the South African naturalist R. D. Bradfield (1882–1949).

References

External links
 Bradfield's swift - Species text in The Atlas of Southern African Birds.

Bradfield's swift
Birds of Southern Africa
Fauna of Namibia
Bradfield's swift
Taxonomy articles created by Polbot